The 1994 Baltimore Football Club season was the first in the history of the Baltimore CFL franchise. Initially intended to be named the Baltimore CFL Colts, the team was forced to adopt a generic name after Robert Irsay successfully enjoined the team from using any name that might associate with the former Baltimore Colts, which he had controversially moved to Indiana 11 years prior. The team became the first American-based CFL team to play in the Grey Cup, but lost to the hometown BC Lions on a last second field goal.

Preseason

Season standings

Season schedule

Playoffs

Awards and honors
After the season, other Baltimore Stallions' received awards and accomplishments in the CFL, which are:

1994 Eastern All-Stars

Offense
 Mike Pringle (RB)
 Peter Tuipulotu (FB)
 Chris Armstrong (SB)
 Nick Subis (C)
 Shar Pourdanesh (OT)

Defense
 Irvin Smith (CB)
 Michael Brooks (DS)

Special Teams
 Josh Miller (P)

1994 CFL All-Stars

Offense
 Mike Pringle (RB)
 Shar Pourdanesh (OT)

Defense
 Irvin Smith (CB)

Special Teams
 Josh Miller (P)

See also
 2020 Washington Football Team season, a later season by a pro football team in the Baltimore-Washington Metroplex that used a generic team name

References

Baltimore Stallions
James S. Dixon Trophy championship seasons
Baltimore CFLers
1994 Canadian Football League season by team